Apollophanes texanus is a species of running crab spider in the family Philodromidae. It is found in the USA and Mexico.

References

Further reading

 
 
 
 
 
 
 
 
 

Philodromidae
Spiders described in 1904